Bruce Edward Alexander (born September 17, 1965) is a former American football defensive back who played five seasons in the National Football League with the Detroit Lions and Miami Dolphins. He played college football at Stephen F. Austin State University and attended Lufkin High School in Lufkin, Texas.

References

External links
Just Sports Stats

Living people
1965 births
Players of American football from Texas
American football defensive backs
African-American players of American football
Stephen F. Austin Lumberjacks football players
Detroit Lions players
Miami Dolphins players
People from Lufkin, Texas
21st-century African-American people
20th-century African-American sportspeople